Nika Wodwood (born October 20, 1993, Protvino, Moscow Oblast), better known as nixelpixel, is a Russian intersectional feminist and cyber activist who maintains her video blog on the  YouTube. The most famous feminist in Russia, according to the publication Meduza.

Biography 
Wodwood was born on October 20, 1993 in   Protvino. Parents are design engineers, employees of the Mars, Incorporated. In 1999, her parents went on a business trip to the UK, and Veranika moved with them to a suburb of London, where she lived for two years. Returning to Russia, Wodwood entered school in Stupino.

In 2011-2015, she studied at the Faculty of Sociology of the Higher School of Economics. In 2013, Wodwood became interested in feminism after she met Zhenya Belykh's the blog, the creator of the feminist community The Power of the Pussy on VKontakte, although she was initially ironic about the topic of feminism.

She worked as an assistant to the creative director in an advertising agency, but left there, according to her statement, because of the intolerant environment in the team. Since 2011, she was engaged in illustration, after leaving the advertising agency she was engaged in it remotely as her main activity. In the middle of summer 2017, she quit an advertising agency where she was engaged in copywriting and started making money on her video blog through Patreon and advertising on YouTube. She got married in May 2021.  In August of the same year, she announced that she was moving to Vienna, following her husband, who entered the master's program at the Central European University.

Wodwood's public activities have been criticized, including in a feminist environment.

References

External links
 

1993 births
Living people
People from Moscow Oblast
Russian YouTubers
Russian feminists
Russian women's rights activists
Russian emigrants to Austria
Higher School of Economics alumni
Russian women illustrators
Russian female comics artists
Russian video bloggers